The Hathigumpha Inscription (pronounced: ɦɑːt̪ʰiːgumpʰɑː) is a seventeen line inscription in Prakrit language incised in Brahmi script in a cavern called Hathigumpha in Udayagiri hills, near Bhubaneswar in Odisha, India. Dated between 2nd-century BCE and 1st-century CE, it was inscribed by the Jain king Kharavela of Kalinga kingdom.

The Hathigumpha Inscription, among other things, presents a biographical sketch of a king in the eastern region of ancient India (now part of and near Odisha). It also includes the religious values, public infrastructure projects, military expeditions and its purpose, and socio-cultural information. Paleographically, the inscription dates from mid-1st century BCE to early 1st century CE.

Location and history
The Udayagiri hills host many ancient rock-cut caves such as the Rani Gumpha. Among these, to the west of Rani Gumpha, is a cavern called Hathigumpha on the southern face of Udayagiri hills. The inscription is named after this cavern. It is found partly in front and partly the ceiling of the cave. Though dated to between 2nd-century BCE and 1st-century CE, the inscription was unknown to the scholars till they were rediscovered by A. Sterling and published in Asiatic Researches XV in 1825. An eye-copy prepared by Kittoe was published by James Prinsep in 1837, followed by a trace by Alexander Cunningham in 1877. R.L. Mitra published a modified version in his Antiquities of Orissa in 1880.

The first cast of this important inscription was published by Bhagwan Lal Indraji in 1884, followed by publication of an ink impression in 1906 by Bloch. Indraji was the first scholar to declare that the king eulogised in the Hathigumpha inscription was named Kharavela, but the cast impression, his translation and interpretation had many errors.

The translations, disputes, problems with Hathigumpha inscription and various corrections have attracted the attention of scholars such as Kielhorn, Fleet, Luders, Banerji, Jayaswal, Konow, Thomas, Majumdar, Barua, Pandey, Sircar and many others. According to Walter Spink, a historian known for his studies on Ajanta and other cave monuments of India, early misreadings and misinterpretations of the Hathigumpha inscription have led to errors and incorrect theories being widely held about the history of Andhra Pradesh, Odisha, Deccan region and early India.

Description
This inscription, consisting of seventeen lines has been incised in Prakrit language and Brahmi script. The inscription starts on the overhanging brow of Hathigumpha cavern and the first eight lines are visible at the front. The remaining nine lines continue on the same rock, but given the sloping shape of the cavern, it appears on the cavern's roof. The seventeen lines cover about 15 feet by 5.5 feet of the stone's surface. Below this inscribed rock, the cavern's walls are rock-cut and some sections polished. These too have inscriptions, but these were added between the 10th and 11th-century, and are called minor Hathigumpha inscriptions. Closer to the floor, there are small rock cut partitions which do not form a wall between the cells.

A hand writing analysis suggests that three different ancient scribes likely worked together to produce this inscription. The scribes likely chiseled the irregular overhanging rock and then deep incised the Brahmi text. Lines 1–6 of the main Hathigumpha inscription are well preserved, while last four Lines 16–17 show losses in the left part and the rest of these lines partially preserved. The other seven lines – Lines 7 through 15 – in the middle are problematic and can be read in many different ways. According to Jayaswal, a scholar whose ink impressions and readings are among the most cited in the studies related to Hathigumpha inscription:
Line 5 has 13 syllables obliterated
Half of Line 6 record is missing, while Line 7 record is mostly gone (these are 6th and 7th year of Kharavela's reign)
Lines 8 through 15 show much natural damage and large gaps, making them prone to misreadings
These middle lines have been eroded and corrupted by natural processes over 2,000 some years. Processes such as rains, dripping water, dust, hornets and such causes have leveled or corrupted some Brahmi characters. In some cases so much that it is difficult to distinguish whether a cut is a chisel mark or a part of an aksara (letter). In other cases, the natural processes have added an angular-stroke or mark that can be included or rejected as an intended modification. The different hand writing styles found in the inscription further complicate what and how to read the letters. Thus, variant casts and ink impressions of the Hathigumpha inscriptions have been published, in part fueling the disagreements, interpretations and different scholarly translations.

Date
The mid and late-19th century scholarship suggested that this inscription may be from the 3rd or 2nd-century BCE. According to Buhler, the palaeographical analysis suggests this inscription cannot be earlier than the 2nd-century BCE, or later than 1st-century BCE. In 1920, Jayaswal and Banerji stated that this inscription cannot be placed before the 2nd-century, and may be a bit later. On palaeographic grounds and considering it with information in other ancient Indian inscriptions, Sircar places this in the second half of the 1st-century BCE, or possibly in the first decades of the 1st-century CE.

Inscription
The seventeen lines of the inscription has been variously translated by many. The translation published by Jayaswal and Banerji in  Epigraphia Indica Volume 20 (public domain), with alternate readings by other scholars, is as follows:

Significance

The Hathigumpha Inscription is the main source of information about the Jain Kalinga ruler Kharavela. His year-by-year achievements in this inscription, states Richard Salomon, "approximates the character of a pure panegyric". This is an early prototype of prashasti style of inscriptions.

The disagreements between scholars is in reading with interpolations, interpreting, dating and then linking the names of places and people mentioned with other records and general chronology of ancient events assuming a particular reading is correct. Notable mentions in the Hathigumpha Inscription include:
major public infrastructure projects in ancient India (these lines can be clearly read)
charitable donations to monks, public, Brahmins
festivals and arts
a war against the Satavahana king Satakarni. This mention has been a key contributor to the mis-dating of many Buddhist monuments in the central India, states Walter Spink. First the Hathigumpha inscription was dated between the 3rd and 2nd-century BCE, then Satakarni was treated as a contemporary of Kharavela based on this reading. This error compounded, leading to the widely repeated belief in modern Indian literature that the earliest Andhra dynasties started in late 3rd to early 2nd-century BCE, that these ancient Andhra rulers and others built the Chaitya halls at Bhaja, Nasik, Kondane and some Krishna river valley sites between 300 BCE and 100 BCE. This error has multiplied, says Spink, whereby many other inscriptions, coins, texts mentioning the names of Andhra kings, along with monuments have been dated to far more ancient period, than what later discoveries and scholarship has found. This error has also affected the chronology of art development in Indian history. Many of these monuments and dates should be shifted forward by 200 to 300 years, to 1st-century CE and early 2nd-century CE.

a Nanda king building a water canal, which was then extended by Kharavela to the Kalinga capital. This Nanda king is by one interpretation 130 years senior (largely disputed), by another reading about 300 years prior to Kharavela. If Kharavela is placed in the 1st-century BCE and this reading is assumed to reflect real events over 300 years in ancient India, then this interpretation implies a historical record keeping between the 4th-century BCE and 1st-century BCE, places a public water infrastructure project by an Indian ruler also in the 4th-century BCE, along with a Jaina tradition of image worship.
a Nanda king taking away "Ka[li]ngajinam". This has been interpreted as either taking away a Jaina image or its seat from Kalinga or conquering a place in Kalinga, which was then brought back to Kalinga by Kharavela. In 1925, Glasenapp suggested that may mean an idol of a Jina. Modern era scholars such as Rao and Thapar too interpret it as a Jaina image (idol) was taken away by Nanda king (c. 5th-century BCE) and then it being brought back by Kharavela (c. 2nd century BCE). According to Sonya Quintalla, this should not be interpreted to be an idol or image. The ancient archaeological sites related to Jainism such as a part of the Mathura site at Kankali Tila confirms that there were no anthropomorphic idol-image worship in these centuries of Jainism, rather there was the practice of worshipping non-figural objects. According to her, even in Udayagiri, the Mancapuri cave nearby shows a worship gathering and there is no anthropomorphic figural idol or image there. Thus, the interpretation of this word as idol or image, and it being taken away centuries before Kharavela cannot be correct.

some Yavana (Greek) king, forcing him to retreat to Mathura. The name of the Yavana king is not clear. R. D. Banerji and K.P. Jayaswal in 1920 read the name of the Yavana king as "Dimita", and identify him with Demetrius I of Bactria. Romila Thapar too, in The Past Before Us published in 2013, states that it is "probably the Indo-Greek king Demetrios". However, according to Ramaprasad Chanda and other scholars, this identification results in "chronological impossibilities". This interpolated reading, states Sircar, is suspect by Banerji and Jayaswal's own admission, and cannot be true based on other inscriptions and ancient records about Indo-Greek kings. According to Sailendra Nath Sen, the Yavana ruler was certainly not Demerius; he might have been a later Indo-Greek ruler of eastern Punjab.

According to Salomon, the "readings, translations, and historical interpretations" of the Hathigumpha inscription "varies widely by different scholars", and it is not possible to establish its single standard version. These interpretations have created significantly different histories of ancient India, some with phantom eras, states Salomon. Newly discovered inscriptions at Guntupalli in Andhra Pradesh have shed further light on this inscription.

See also
Indian inscriptions

Notes

References

Bibliography
 Epigraphia Indica, Vol. XX (1929–30). Delhi: Manager of Publications, 1933.
 Sadananda Agrawal: Śrī Khāravela, Published by Sri Digambar Jain Samaj, Cuttack, 2000.
 ; For his updated analysis: B Barua (1938), Hathigumpha Inscription of Kharavela, Indian Historical Quarterly XIV, pp. 459–85

External links
Epigraphia Indica, Vol. XX (1929–30). Delhi: Manager of Publications, Reprinted 1983.
Full text of the Hathigumpha inscription in English
Comparative study of the Inscriptions of Kharavela and Vasishithiputra Pulumavi
Palaeography, language and art of Hatigumpha inscription (archive)

2nd-century BC inscriptions
1st-century BC inscriptions
1st-century inscriptions
1825 archaeological discoveries
Indian inscriptions
History of Odisha
Kalinga (India)
150 BC
Jain inscriptions